Berlin Modernism Housing Estates is a World Heritage Site designated in 2008, comprising six separate subsidized housing estates in Berlin. Dating mainly from the years of the Weimar Republic (1919–1933), when the city of Berlin was particularly progressive socially, politically and culturally, they are outstanding examples of the building reform movement that contributed to improving housing and living conditions for people with low incomes through innovative approaches to architecture and urban planning. The estates also provide exceptional examples of new urban and architectural typologies, featuring fresh design solutions, as well as technical and aesthetic innovations.

Bruno Taut, Martin Wagner and Walter Gropius were among the leading architects of these projects which exercised considerable influence on the development of housing around the world.

List of Housing Estates

See also
Bauhaus and its Sites in Weimar, Dessau and Bernau
New Frankfurt, Frankfurt 1925–1932
Weissenhof Estate, Stuttgart 1927

Further reading
 Hasple, Jörg; Jaeggi, Annemarie (eds.) (2007) Housing Estates in the Berlin Modern Style (2nd ed.). Berlin/Munich: Deutscher Kunstverlag. 
 Landesdenkmalamt (ed.) (2009) Berlin Modernism Housing Estates (English and German edition). Salenstein, Switzerland: Braun Publishing.

Notes

External links
 Berlin Modernism Housing Estates : UNESCO Official Website
 Berlin Modernism Housing Estates on visitBerlin.de
 Daily Drone

Housing in Germany
World Heritage Sites in Germany
Modernist architecture in Germany
Buildings and structures in Berlin
Tourist attractions in Berlin
Housing estates in Germany